Dr. Jacob Geiger House-Maud Wyeth Painter House, also known as the United Missouri Bank, is a historic home located at St. Joseph, Missouri.  It was designed by the architecture firm of Eckel & Aldrich and built in 1911–1912.  It is a -story, Gothic Revival style masonry building with a three-story crenellated tower and a two-story crenellated tower. It features an arcaded porch and a four-bay bow window with gargoyles.  The house has been converted for commercial uses.

It was listed on the National Register of Historic Places in 1986.

References

Houses on the National Register of Historic Places in Missouri
Gothic Revival architecture in Missouri
Houses completed in 1912
Houses in St. Joseph, Missouri
National Register of Historic Places in Buchanan County, Missouri